Leonard Sinclair Sparks (March 28, 1939 – March 19, 2021) was a welterweight boxer who won three Canadian boxing titles, including the Maritime welterweight championship, the Canadian junior welterweight championship, and the Canadian welterweight championship. Sparks was a switch hitter, who had power in both hands and finished his career with 28 wins, 10 losses, and 2 draws, including 17 knockouts. Sparks would appear on match cards in Madison Square Garden and the Boston Garden in the 1960s. He was also scheduled to appear in Madison Square Garden against Charley Scott of Philadelphia on the undercard of the first bout of Muhammad Ali vs. Floyd Patterson. The Muhammad Ali vs. Floyd Patterson bout would be relocated to the Las Vegas Convention Center, and Lennie would instead fight Charley Scott in the Boston Garden.

Early life

Leonard Sinclair Sparks was born in Waverley, Nova Scotia on March 28, 1939, he was a son of the late Lillian (Williams) Sparks and Harold Sparks Sr.

Boxing career

Lennie came out of the Creighton Street gym in Halifax, Nova Scotia, which was run by the Paris brothers of New Glasgow, Nova Scotia. Lennie Sparks was known as a switch hitter in boxing because he could knock opponents out with either hand. He once told Hugh Townsend how training with Keith Paris at the Creighton Street gym helped him grow into a hard puncher with a knack for good defence.

He went on to be trained by Thomas George "Young Tom" McCluskey who would help Sparks take both the Canadian junior welterweight and Canadian welterweight titles. Lennie Sparks turned pro on May 10, 1956 in Halifax, Nova Scotia, winning his pro debut against Keith Paris by knockout. On October 6, 1959, Sparks knocked out Jackie Hayden of Westville, Nova Scotia in Pictou County to win the Canadian junior welterweight title. In his next fight he would score a TKO over Bernie Raines in Halifax, Nova Scotia before taking the opportunity to fight his first bout in the United States. On December 17, 1959, Sparks would fight against Willie Bey in the New Alhambra Arena in South Philadelphia, winning by points. Sparks would return home and fight three fights in which he went 2-1 before returning to the United States. In 1961, Sparks would fight against Vince Shomo in Madison Square Garden in New York. The six round fight resulted in a points win for Vince Shomo.

Six years after winning the Canadian junior welterweight title, a 25 year old Sparks defeated Peter Schmidt of Toronto, Ontario by a fifth round TKO to claim the Canadian welterweight title on October 17, 1965. He had now won Canadian boxing titles in three different weight divisions. The newly crowned welterweight champion Lennie Sparks would head back to the United States and fight two more times in the following month of November. First, he would fight Dick French of Providence, Rhode Island, losing a close decision in the Boston Garden. 21 days later, he was scheduled to appear in Madison Square Garden against Charley Scott of Philadelphia on the undercard of the first Muhammad Ali vs. Floyd Patterson bout on November 22, 1965. The Muhammad Ali vs. Floyd Patterson fight would be relocated to the Las Vegas Convention Center, and Lennie would instead fight Charley Scott in the Boston Garden in Boston. Sparks would knock Charley Scott down twice in the first round but was knocked out shortly-after in the second round. Two weeks after he was knocked out in Boston by Charley Scott, he was scheduled to fight a non-title bout in Montreal's Paul Sauvé Arena against Joey Durelle of Baie-Sainte-Anne, New Brunswick. The fight would go all ten rounds and result in a unanimous decision loss for Lennie Sparks. The president of the Canadian Professional Boxing Federation told Nanaimo Daily News that Sparks was "lucky" he was not seriously injured and should not have been allowed to fight.

After a nearly eight-month layoff Lennie Sparks would fight Jim Meilleur in another non-title bout and lose a ten round decision in Summerside, Prince Edward Island.

On May 11, 1967, Sparks would lose his Canadian welterweight title through a unanimous 12-round decision in favor of Fernand Simard at the Granby Arena in Granby, Quebec. Despite his loss, the Canadian Professional Boxing Federation would declare the fight with Fernand a non-title bout and Sparks was still regarded as the champion. The CPBF then ordered Sparks to defend the title against the top contender Joey Durelle. He would officially lose his Canadian welterweight title to Joey Durelle of Baie-Sainte-Anne, New Brunswick through a unanimous decision in Fredericton. 5 years after the title loss, the former Canadian welterweight champion would return to the ring a final time to fight Jerry Wells of Cleveland, Ohio, knocking him out in the sixth round in Halifax, Nova Scotia.

Sparks career would span from 1956 to 1972. The Nova Scotian boxer fought in 40 bouts and finished with a record of 28(17 KOs)-10-2. He was once ranked the 10th welterweight in the World.

Honors and awards
Sparks was inducted into the Black Ice Hockey and Sports Hall of Fame at the Alderney Landing Cultural Convention Centre in Dartmouth, Nova Scotia, Canada on August 25, 2007.
The Canadian Professional Boxing Council presented Lennie Sparks with the C.P.B.C. Honorary Lifetime Champion Award on November 17, 2018, in Halifax, Nova Scotia.
Sparks was also among the athletes inducted into the Maritime Sport Hall of Fame in 2019.

Personal life
Leonard was a veteran who served in the Canadian Army Reserve Unit. He worked for the Canadian National Railway and would retire after 34 years of service. He was a Shriner of Philae and a former Worshipful Master of Masons Equity Lodge 106.

Death
Leonard Sinclair "Lennie" Sparks died on March 19, 2021, in Halifax, Nova Scotia, Canada, at the age of 81.

Further reading
Charles R. Saunders, the author of the 1990's book Sweat and Soul also wrote:
"...a brawl broke out in the audience while he was fighting in the ring. Lennie turned to see if anyone he knew was involved. Next thing he knew, he was on the canvas, listening to the end of the referee's 10-count. For the rest of his career, Sparks concentrated on what was happening inside the ropes."

References 

1939 births
2021 deaths
Canadian male boxers
People from the Halifax Regional Municipality